The University of Orléans is a French university, in the Academy of Orléans and Tours. As of July 2015 it is a member of the regional university association Leonardo da Vinci consolidated University.

History

In 1230, when for a time the doctors of the University of Paris were scattered, a number of the teachers and disciples took refuge in Orléans; when pope Boniface VIII, in 1298, promulgated the sixth book of the Decretals, he appointed the doctors of Bologna and the doctors of Orléans to comment upon it.

St. Yves (1253–1303) studied civil law at Orléans, and Pope Clement V also studied there law and letters; by a papal bull published at Lyon, 27 January 1306, he endowed the Orléans institutes with the title and privileges of a university.

Twelve later popes granted the new university many privileges. In the 14th century it had as many as five thousand students from France, Germany, Lorraine, Burgundy, Champagne, Picardy, Normandy, Touraine, Guyenne and Scotland.

The current university was founded in 1960, after its medieval predecessor was closed down in 1793 and merged into the University of France in 1808.

Organisation
The university is organised into three Teaching and Research divisions (UFR):
 Law, Economics and Management
 Literature, Languages and Human Sciences
 Science and Technology

In addition, it has: 
 4 University Institutes of Technology
 1 Science of the Universe Observatory
 1 National Higher Institute of Teaching and Education
 1 School of Engineering
 1 School of Kinesiology

Notable people

Faculty

Ancient
Robert Joseph Pothier (1699–1722), lawyer.
Daniel Jousse (1704–1781), lawyer.

Modern
 Pierre Roubertoux (born 1937) - behavioural geneticist.
 Jeanne Henriette Louis (born 1938) - professor emeritus of North American civilization
 Michel Cullin (1944 – 2020) - political scientist 
 Morinobu Endo (born 1946) - Japanese physicist and chemist 
 Christian Renoux (born 1960) - historian and an activist for nonviolence
 Nikolay Nenovsky (born 1963) - Bulgarian economist, working in the fields of monetary theory and policy
 Emmanuel Trélat (born 1974) - mathematician

Alumni

Ancient
 Emo of Friesland (c.1175–1237) - Frisian scholar and abbot 
 Eustache Deschamps (1346 – 1406 or 1407) - poet
 Walter de Coventre (died 1371 or 1372) - Scottish ecclesiastic 
 Walter Forrester (died 1425 or 1426) - Bishop of Brechin, Scotland 
 Henry de Lichton (died 1440) - Scottish prelate and diplomat, Bishop of Moray and Bishop of Aberdeen
 Oliver King (c.1432 – 1503) - Bishop of Exeter and Bishop of Bath and Wells 
 Michel Bucy (1484 – 1511) - Archbishop of Bourges
 John Calvin (1509–1564), influential French theologian, pastor and reformer during the Protestant Reformation
 Anne du Bourg (1521, Riom – 1559) - magistrate, Protestant martyr
 William Whittingham (c. 1524–1579) - English Puritan, translator of the Geneva Bible
 Claude Fauchet (1530 – 1602) - historian, antiquary, and pioneering romance philologist
 Anselmus de Boodt (Bruges, 1550 - 1632) - humanist, mineralogist, physician and naturalist
 François de Joyeuse (1562 – 1615) - churchman and politician
 Jørgen Bjelke (1621 – 1696) - Norwegian officer and nobleman
 Molière (1622–1673), French playwright and actor, considered to be one of the greatest masters of comedy in Western literature
 Pierre de Fermat (c. 1601 – 1665), best known for his Fermat's principle for light propagation and his Fermat's Last Theorem in number theory
 St Ivo of Kermartin (died 1303), patron of lawyers
 Étienne de Mornay, counsellor of Philippe IV le Bel
 Johannes Reuchlin (1455–1522)
 Guillaume Budé (1468–1540) - scholar and humanist
 Francis Bothwell, Procurator of the Scottish Nation at Orléans during 1513–1514, later a member of the Parliament of Scotland and a judge
 Étienne de La Boétie (1530–1563) - writer, poet, political theorist
 Thomas Brooke alias Cobham (1533–1578) - English nobleman, privateer, conspirator
 Agrippa d'Aubigné (1552–1630) - poet, soldier, propagandist
 Mathieu Molé (1584 – 1656) - statesman
 Théophraste Renaudot (1586–1653) - physician, philanthropist, journalist 
 Charles Perrault (1628–1703) - author
 Johann Christoph Wagenseil (1633 - 1705) - German historian, Orientalist, jurist and Christian Hebraist
 Conrad von Reventlow (1644 – 1708) - Grand Chancellor of Denmark 
 Jean de La Bruyère (1645–1696) - philosopher
 Jacques Pierre Brissot (1754 – 1793) - leading member of the Girondins
 Jacques Paul Migne (1800 – 1875) - theologian
 Jean-Eugène Robert-Houdin (1805 – 1871) - watchmaker, magician and illusionist
 Alphonse Magnien (1837 – 1902) - priest, theologian, academic administrator

Modern
 Michel Jébrak (born c.1948) - geologist
 Ibni Oumar Mahamat Saleh (1949 – disappeared 2008) politician and opposition leader Chad
 Thomas Boni Yayi (born 1951) - banker and politician, President of Benin
 François Bonneau (born 1953, in Amilly, Loiret)  educationalist, politician SP
 Norbert-Bertrand Barbe - art historian, semiologist, artist and writer 
 Hussein Hajj Hassan (born 1960) - politician and minister of industry Lebanon
 Olivier Carré (born 1961) - independent politician; mayor of the city of Orléans
 Patrick Grant (born 1972) - Scottish fashion designer and businessman
 Jeannette Bougrab (born 1973, in Déols) French lawyer and politician UMP

Recipients of honorary degree
 Isaac Ehrlich (born 1938, in Israel) - economist
 Horst Möller (born 1943, in Breslau) - German contemporary historian
 Józef Dulak (born 1962 in Nowy Sącz) - Polish scientist and professor of biological sciences

See also
 List of medieval universities
 List of public universities in France by academy

References

External links

 Official website

 
Orleans, University of
Orleans, University of
1306 establishments in Europe
1300s establishments in France
1793 disestablishments in France
1960 establishments in France